Dichomeris cinnamicostella is a moth in the family Gelechiidae. It was described by Zeller in 1877. It is found in Panama.

References

Moths described in 1877
cinnamicostella